Robert Norris Parker (27 March 1891 – 1950) was a Scottish professional footballer whose position was centre forward.

He played professionally in Scotland with Rangers and Morton, and in England with Everton and Nottingham Forest during a career interrupted by World War I, in which he was seriously injured. He later served as manager of Fraserburgh in Scotland and Bohemians in Ireland.

Playing career
Born in Glasgow, Parker started off his career with Junior team Ashfield followed by three seasons at Rangers, during which he had a scoring record of a goal every game but was always a backup to the equally prolific Willie Reid; Rangers won the Scottish Football League title in each of those years, but it is unclear if Parker was awarded any medals, having only featured in 2, 3 and 9 of the fixtures respectively.

With the situation unchanged at the beginning of a fourth campaign, he moved to England to play for Everton in 1913 for a fee of £1,500. He finished top goalscorer for the Toffees in the 1913–14 and 1914–15 seasons, the latter of which he was top goalscorer overall in the First Division while Everton were crowned champions.

The First World War then interrupted Parker's the career, and ultimately robbed him from cementing a place amongst Everton's greats as he returned home from the conflict with a bullet lodged in his back. The injury made him a shadow of his former self and he was later sold to Nottingham Forest.

Coaching career 
In retirement he worked as manager of Irish club Bohemians where he coached them to the Clean Sweep in 1927–28; winning the League of Ireland, FAI Cup, Shield and Leinster Senior Cup.

Personal life
Parker served as a private in the Royal Scots Fusiliers and Labour Corps during the First World War.

References

External links
 Bobby Parker's Story, Liverpool Echo, 2008
Player history, Everton FC

1891 births
1950 deaths
Date of death missing
Scottish footballers
Footballers from Glasgow
Ashfield F.C. players
Rangers F.C. players
Everton F.C. players
Nottingham Forest F.C. players
British Army personnel of World War I
Royal Scots Fusiliers soldiers
Bohemian F.C. managers
English Football League players
First Division/Premier League top scorers
Scottish football managers
Scottish Football League players
Scotland junior international footballers
Scottish Junior Football Association players
League of Ireland managers
Fraserburgh F.C. players
Highland Football League players
Expatriate association football managers
Scottish expatriate sportspeople in Ireland
Association football forwards
Royal Pioneer Corps soldiers
Greenock Morton F.C. players